Mashour bin Abdulaziz Al Saud (born 1942) is a member of the House of Saud and a member of the Kingdom of Saudi Arabia's Allegiance Council. He is the half-brother of King Salman and the father-in-law of Saudi Arabia's Crown Prince, Mohammed bin Salman.

Biography
Prince Mashour was born in 1942. His father is King Abdulaziz, and his mother is Nouf bint Nawwaf bin Nuri Al Shaalan. They married in November 1935. Nouf was a member of the Ruwala tribe based in the northwestern Saudi Arabia, Transjordan and Syria. Prince Mashour has two full brothers; Prince Thamir and Prince Mamdouh.

Prince Mashour is a businessman. In August 2009, the Washington Institute for Near East Policy identified him as a potential successor to King Abdullah of Saudi Arabia.

His wife is Noura bint Mohammed bin Saud Al Kabir, daughter of Mohammed bin Saud and granddaughter of Noura bint Abdul Rahman Al Saud and Saud Al Kabir. His daughter Sara is married to Saudi Arabia's crown prince and defense minister Mohammad bin Salman Al Saud. Prince Mashour has also a son, Abdulaziz.

Ancestry

References

Mashour
Mashour
1942 births
Living people
Place of birth missing (living people)
Mashour